The Ellis School is an independent, all-girls, college-preparatory school located in the Shadyside neighborhood in the East End of Pittsburgh, Pennsylvania, United States. The school serves girls aged 3 to grade 12.

History

Ellis' past 
When Pittsburgh's Pennsylvania College for Women closed its college preparatory school called Dilworth Hall, Sara Ellis decided to start a proprietary school of her own by taking over a small institution called Miss Shaw's School. With three teachers and 41 students in kindergarten through twelfth grade, Miss Ellis' School opened in rented quarters at 4860 Ellsworth Avenue. Ellis and Marie Craighead continued as headmistress and assistant headmistress for 25 years. The school purchased the original property in 1933.

By 1939, enrollment had grown to more than 200 students, taught by a faculty of 27. Ellis applied for and was granted charter accreditation from the Middle States Association of Schools and Colleges in 1928 and incorporated the school under a non-profit charter and sold it to a self-perpetuating board of trustees in November 1929 as the Ellis School. That same year, Ellis merged with Miss Shearer's School and, in 1933, absorbed Miss Simonson's School, two small, Pittsburgh independent girls' schools.

When Ellis retired in 1941, she was succeeded by Harriet Sheldon from 1941 to 1944 and then by Marjorie L. Tilley from 1944 to 1955. In 1947, the school purchased the Ogden Edwards house at the corner of Fifth and South Negley Avenues, the Lazar house at 922 South Negley Avenue, and a vacant Lockhart property on Ivy Street. Enrollment increased to over 300. By 1955, the year of Tilley's retirement, there were temporary classrooms across the street at Third Presbyterian Church, Hunt Armory, and the East Liberty YWCA.

Marion Hope Hamilton became headmistress in 1955 and began searching for a new property. The school purchased the 5.1-acre site at 6425 Fifth Avenue, part of the estate of Charles and Thomas Arbuthnot, where it remains today. The groundbreaking ceremony took place in May 1958. There were two houses on the property, and the school razed one to make room for a new facility. The other house became the lower school for the next 30 years, and 116 lower school students moved into their quarters in late 1958. 
 
The dedication of the buildings for the middle and upper schools took place in November 1959. Enrollment was 383, with a faculty of 39. In 1961, the school established a Cum Laude Society chapter.

Helen Mason Moore became headmistress in 1962 and served as headmistress until 1971. During her tenure, she created department heads and consulted with them on academic policies, allowed seniors to complete independent study and senior projects, brought visiting speakers to the school for weekly assemblies, and opened the school's facilities to the community. Among other groups, the Pittsburgh Savoyards spent several years in residence at the Ellis School.

In 1969, the trustees decided to look into the advisability of coeducation for Ellis. In the fall of 1972, the board of trustees decided that Ellis would remain a single-sex school. Judith Cohen Callomon '54, retired upper school director and former acting head of school, recalled, "When the decision was announced in assembly, the girls responded en masse in one of those ear-splitting, bench-thumping ovations."

Janet Jacobs succeeded Helen Moore as headmistress in 1971. In 1974, Jacobs announced May mini-courses for the upper school. This "third semester" in the last few weeks of the school year offers more than 50 courses.

In 1977, the school instituted the Experimental Intellectual Program (EIP) to provide funds to teachers for courses, conferences, curriculum planning, and travel. The school began to award one travel grant yearly. In 1984, the school made the EIP permanent and renamed it the Janet Jacobs Enrichment Program (JEP).

In 1973, Ellis added an optional afternoon kindergarten session. The full-day session quickly filled and, within a few years, replaced the half-day kindergarten entirely. In 1985, the school introduced an extended daycare program for lower school students. Shortly after that, it expanded the program to include students from the middle school grades. The school occupied girls in the program from 3:15–5:45 pm with snacks, indoor and outdoor activities, homework, music, and art. In 1990, the Ellis faculty started the Fifth Avenue Family Child Care Center, located in the basement of Arbuthnot House. The center, incorporated and managed by the faculty, is a distinct entity.

In 1974, the board approved plans for adding studio space and a new audio-visual room to the Fine Arts Building. In 1975, Ellis embarked on a ten-year development program.

By 1980, the school had raised $3.5 million, resulting in an enlarged and renewed Babcock Library, grown from 4,000 to 33,000 volumes since 1961; a new science wing; additional Middle School facilities; a mini-gym; remodeled arts rooms; and new playgrounds. In 1980, the program's second phase, Development II, was launched. Goals included maintaining a low student-faculty ratio, keeping faculty salaries competitive, increasing population, and ensuring the proper upkeep of the physical plant. Development II aimed to boost the book value of the Ellis endowment from two to four million dollars and increase annual giving. Spurred by a challenge grant, annual giving climbed to $175,000 by the end of the 1981–82 fiscal year. Two years later, the endowment passed four million dollars.

The long-range development plan culminated in the building of a new lower school. The school required more extensive and updated facilities to replace the Arbuthnot building. The school launched the Lower School Building and Endowment Campaign to secure funds. Construction was delayed by negotiations with neighbors protesting that the school might encroach on their residential neighborhood.

Jacob retired in 1986, and Ellen E. Fleming, Ellis' new headmistress, arrived from Atlanta to oversee site preparation. By October 1987, more than three million dollars had been pledged to the campaign, and construction began on a pay-as-you-go basis. The Alice S. Beckwith Building, with a science lab, music room, and gym/activities room, was formally dedicated on April 15, 1988. Arbuthnot House became an administrative center, with offices for the head of school, development, alumnae affairs, admissions, and business manager, and space for a lower school library and computer room. In addition, there were monies to enhance the endowment, whose book value at the end of the 1987–88 school year was $5.3 million.

Ellen Fleming resigned as head of school after four years. Helen Stevens Chinitz succeeded her and served for the 1990–91 school year. Following her resignation, Frances A. Koch, the upper school director, served as interim head of school for a year.

In 1992, a search committee selected Rebecca T. Upham as head of school. She began Symposia, which brought speakers such as columnist and writer Anna Quindlen, astronaut Sally Ride, researcher Carol Gilligan, and author Mary Pipher to address standing-room-only crowds.

Ellis today 
The mid-90s saw record-breaking enrollment and a technology plan focused on integrating technology across the curriculum and including a wireless laptop program in grades 8–12. Ellis held a $9.7 million Capital Campaign, which contributed to the construction of the Upper School Hillman Family Building, an increase in faculty endowment, a new alumnae hall, and a new athletic facility containing a regulation-sized gymnasium, climbing wall, and training center.

Upham departed at the end of the 2000–01 academic year to become a head of school in Boston. Judith Cohen Callomon, '54, took over as acting head of school for the 2001–02 school year.

Mary H. Grant, former assistant head and upper school director at the Springside School in Philadelphia, began as head of school on July 1, 2002. In her first year, Grant hosted Jehan Sadat, the widow of the late Egyptian president, as the Ellis Symposium speaker, and in 2006 hosted Michael Thompson, author, and psychologist. Grant announced her retirement in 2008, and A. Randol Benedict, admissions director at the Garrison Forest School in Maryland, began as head of school in July 2009.

In 2012, Ellis had nearly 500 students, a faculty of 78, and an endowment of 25 million dollars.

School structure

Student support 
Every new student is assigned a "big sister" or "class sister" to guide her through the transition period.

The Ellis Parents Association (EPA) works to help the school through volunteer programs and fundraising efforts.

Members of the Ellis Alumnae Association, organized in 1919, volunteer as class agents, event hosts, guest speakers, and Ellis Magazine correspondents.

Faculty 
Of the 67 faculty members at the Ellis School, 66% hold master's degrees.

Average class sizes at the Ellis School are:
 Pre-K and K: 8
 Lower School: 14
 Middle School: 15
 Upper School: 15

The student-to-computer ratio at the Ellis School is 1:1.

Admissions 
Total enrollment at the Ellis School is currently 373 students, aged 3 through grade 12. The student body represents 68 zip codes and 35 school districts. 38% of students are people of color. 35% of students receive need-based financial aid awards and scholarships. The school awarded $1.8 million in financial aid in 2013.

Curriculum 
The school bases the middle and upper schools on a ten-day cycle. Students participate in activities that provide community resources and partnerships one day every other cycle. There are division-wide co-curricular programs in the middle school. In contrast, the students are involved with numerous community programs at the upper school. The school offers an Extended Day Program to pre-K through 8th-grade students. Students who remain on campus after 3:30 and do not participate in extracurricular activities must enroll in this program. For lower school students, an After School Adventures Program provides young girls activities in various areas, such as creative arts, sciences, and athletics.

For pre-K, there are half-day and whole day programs.

Experiential learning
Ellis School students engage in experiential learning, which requires students to apply knowledge to new experiences and hands-on activities..

Community Connections Program
The Community Connection program provides students in grades 9 to 11 engage in local community service. Placements are chosen by faculty members and administrators.

Service learning
Service programs are optional. Opportunities include Afghan Sister School, Earth Cream Sale, Environmental Ambassadors, Guild, and Mitten Tree.

Venture Program
This Venture Program provides students with research opportunities in Pittsburgh's technology and medical labs, arts organizations, environmental sites, and global initiatives. The school reviews applications in early September, and selected students work with Ellis administration and sponsoring organizations.

Senior Experience
This capstone program provides a class trip to the Shakespeare Festival in Canada and requires a senior project. Students can pursue an opportunity in the Venture Program or develop an independent project. Students are also required to develop a senior thesis.

College counseling
College counseling begins in the first year, and 100% of students attend a four-year college. The class of 2014 had an average SAT score of 1880.

Global initiatives
Ellis School offers assembly speakers and special events, and a student-organized Culture Jam and diversity conference extended to students from other area high schools. Students may also take educational trips to various world destinations during March break or during the mini-course session in May. Past trips included Costa Rica, Italy, Spain, and Russia.

Notable alumnae 
Janice Burgess (Class of 1974), creator of The Backyardigans cartoon series
 Annie Dillard, writer, Pulitzer Prize recipient
 Lucy Fato, corporate attorney, general counsel of AIG
Elsie Hillman (Class of 1943), philanthropist
Lani Lazzari, founder of Simple Sugars
 Amy Rosenzweig, biochemist, MacArthur Grant recipient

Former headteachers

References

External links

Girls' schools in Pennsylvania
Educational institutions established in 1916
Private elementary schools in Pennsylvania
Middle schools in Pittsburgh
High schools in Pittsburgh
Private middle schools in Pennsylvania
Private high schools in Pennsylvania
1916 establishments in Pennsylvania